Whatsername, Whatshername, or What's-Her-Name may refer to:

Music
 "Whatsername" (Green Day song)
  Whatsername, a character from the American Idiot musical
 "Whatshername", a song by Peter, Paul, and Mary from Album 1700
 "Whatsername", a song by Deep Purple from Abandon
 "Whatsername", a song by the Suicide Machines from On the Eve of Destruction: 1991–1995

Other uses
 Princess What's-Her-Name, a character in Earthworm Jim

See also
 Hazel Wassername, a character from 30 Rock
 Placeholder name
 What's Her Face (disambiguation)
 What's His Name
 What's My Name? (disambiguation)